Rosa arvensis, the field rose, is a species of wild rose native to Western, Central and Southern Europe.

Names
The plant is variously known as the field rose and white-flowered trailing rose. It may also be called Shakespeare’s musk.

Classification 
The following synonyms were recognised in October 2018:
 Rosa pervirens (Rosa arvensis × sempervirens)
 Rosa polliniana (Rosa arvensis × gallica)
 Rosa repens

Rosa arvensis is closely related to Rosa sempervirens  and Rosa phoenicia .

Description

It blooms in the summer (July in England, May–June in Bulgaria).

Distribution
Rosa arvensis was first identified in England and has been subsequently observed elsewhere in Europe. In England, it can be seen principally in hedges and thickets, while in Bulgaria, it also forms part of the understory of deciduous forests.

It is found in most of the British Isles (except Scotland), France and Belgium, the Pyrenees (at altitudes up to 1000 m) and in more scattered localities elsewhere in Spain, in the west and south of Germany, the foothills of the Alps (up to 1330 m in the Central and Eastern Alps, up to 1400 m in the Maritime Alps), in Italy, Western Hungary, in the Little Carpathians of Slovakia, the Carpathians of Romania, most of the Balkan Peninsula (in Bulgaria up to 1000 m). It has been reported in isolated occurrences in North-western Africa, southern Anatolia and the Levant, but it is likely these are instead instances of R. phoenicia. In Caucasia it is present only as a cultivated plant.

References

Citations

Bibliography
 

 
 
 

 

Flora of Europe
Garden plants of Europe
Roses
Plants described in 1762
Taxa named by William Hudson (botanist)